Cloughduv GAA is a Gaelic Athletic Association based in the village of Cloughduv in County Cork, Ireland. The club is a member of the Muskerry division of Cork GAA. The club fields hurling team only. There are two Gaelic football clubs in the parish (Kilmurry parish) - Canovee and Kilmurry - and there is often an overlap of players between the different clubs.

History
Hurling in the area pre-dates the founding of the Gaelic Athletic Association in Thurles in 1884; when the Cork County Board was inaugurated in 1886, 21 clubs attended including Ryecourt GAA represented by Michael J Keane. Shortly thereafter the name was changed to Cloch Dubh.

Success was not long in arriving, culminating in 1912 in a great victory in the County Senior Beamish Shield.

In the late 1920s Cloughduv joined up with BrideValley to form Éire Óg and this led to victory in the Cork Senior Hurling Championship Final of 1928.

The Éire Óg combination had a short shelf life and Cloughduv reverted to their solo career. Success followed quickly with Cloughduv winning a great County Junior Hurling title in 1940 and the following year winning the County Intermediate title.

The 1950s saw the emergence of an underage phenomenon, when an unprecedented three School Shield Counties came to Cloughduv. Three Mid Cork Minor titles in the 1960s was the genesis of the brilliant teams of the 1970s and 1980s. During this period it can be claimed that Cloughduv were the Intermediate Kingpins of Cork Hurling.

1970 was a great year for the club, winning the Cork Junior Hurling Championship title, beating Courcey Rovers in the Final. In 1973 the Cork Intermediate Hurling Championship title was Cloughduvs when they had victory over Blackrock in the Final. The next big success came in 1983 with another Intermediate County. Here Ballinhassig were the vanquished team. Another IntermediateCounty followed in 1986 with victory over Erins Own. While ultimate County success has eluded Cloughduv since then, there have been many successes at underage level. The Club regraded to Junior status at the end of 2001 and have won Junior Mid Cork titles in 2002, 2005 and 2009.

Off the field of play, the Club has grown and developed over the years. Having originally started out in Ryecourt, the Club in 1967 opened a fantastic playing field to the Western side of the village, Fr O’Driscoll Park. This was home to the club until 2006 and played host to many an epic contest. Cloughduv returned to Ryecourt in 2006 to an extraordinary development with three full size playing pitches (2 with floodlight) and many other facilities.

Achievements
Cork Senior Hurling Championship Winners (1) 1928  Runners-Up 1931 (both with Bride Valley)
 Munster Junior Club Hurling Championship Winners (1) 2018
 Cork Intermediate Hurling Championship Winners (5) 1911, 1941, 1973, 1983, 1986  | Runners-Up 1946, 1981, 1984, 1994
 Cork Junior Hurling Championship Winners (3) 1940, 1970, 2018 | Runners-Up 1910, 1922, 1938, 1948, 1951, 1953, 1956, 1964, 1967, 2009, 2010, 2015
 Cork Minor Hurling Championship Runner-Up 1939, 1941, 1967
 Cork Minor A Hurling Championship Winner (1) 2009  Runner-Up 2006
 Cork Premier Under-21 A Hurling Championship Runners-Up 1983, 1989
 Cork Under-21 A Hurling Championship  Runner-Up 2018
 Mid Cork Junior A Hurling Championship Winner (25 titles) 1933, 1938, 1939, 1940, 1948, 1950, 1951, 1953, 1956, 1957, 1959, 1964, 1967, 1970, 1994, 2002, 2006, 2009, 2010, 2011, 2014, 2015, 2017, 2018, 2019  | Runners-Up 1929, 1944, 1949, 1961, 1963, 1965, 2004, 2012, 2016 
Mid Cork U21 A Hurling Champions                    2018
 Cork Senior A Camogie Championship Winner (1) 2005

Notable players
Hurlers:
 Dinny Barry-Murphy
 John Barry-Murphy
 Kevin Murray
 Noel Dunne
 Ger Ahern
 John Grainger
 Connie Kelly                                                                                                                                                                                                    
 Barry Murphy                                                                                                                                                                                                    
 Camogie:
 Una O'Donoghue
 Briege Corkery
 Joanne O'Callaghan
 Aoife Murray

References

External sources
 Club website
 Kilmurry Parish website

Gaelic games clubs in County Cork
Hurling clubs in County Cork